David Hirsch (born 1962 in Detroit) is an American television personality.  A graduate of Michigan State University, Hirsch spent time as a disc jockey and drummer.  Dick Clark selected Hirsch to be the host of the 1989 (and final) season of American Bandstand.  Later, Hirsch became the co-host of the 1994 syndicated game show Beach Clash.

References

External links
 

1962 births
Living people
Michigan State University alumni
American game show hosts
American radio DJs
American drummers